Amira Arras (Arabic: عميرة آراس) is a town and commune in Mila Province, Algeria. At the 1998 census it had a population of 18,722.

References

Communes of Mila Province